Harborview is a waterfront community located in Baltimore, Maryland, United States. The community sits at the eastern base of the Federal Hill neighborhood in a former industrial area, occupied mainly by shipyards.

It includes a high-rise residential building, low-rise town homes, and marina facilities.

See also
 HarborView Condominium
 List of Baltimore neighborhoods

References

Neighborhoods in Baltimore
South Baltimore